The William B. and Jennie Tufts House is located in Neillsville, Wisconsin. It was added to the National Register of Historic Places in 2012. The house was once home to William B. Tufts, a Colonel in the United States Army, and his wife, Jennie.

References

Houses on the National Register of Historic Places in Wisconsin
Historic house museums in Wisconsin
Houses in Clark County, Wisconsin
1934 establishments in Wisconsin
National Register of Historic Places in Clark County, Wisconsin